The 2016 Meiji Yasuda J3 League (2016 明治安田生命J3リーグ) is the 20th season of the third tier in Japanese football, and the 3rd season of the professional J3 League.

Clubs

To participate, a club must have held an associate membership, or have submitted an application before 30 June 2015, and then passed an inspection to obtain a participation license issued by the J.League Council. The J.League has confirmed the following clubs participating in the 2016 J3 season:

Competition rules
For this season, the league is played in two rounds (home-and-away), each team playing a total of 30 matches.

Each team must have at least 3 players holding professional contracts. Also for this season, three foreign players are allowed per team, plus 1 more from the ASEAN partner country of J.League or from other AFC countries. The matchday roster will consist of 18 players, and up to 3 substitutes will be allowed in a game. The three under-23 clubs can have up to three overage players and one of them must be a goalkeeper.

Promotion and relegation 
Rules for promotion to J2 are largely similar to those of the Japan Football League in recent seasons: to be promoted, a club must hold a J2 license and finish in top 2 of the league. The champions will be promoted directly, in exchange with the 22nd placed J2 club, and the runners-up will participate in the playoffs with the 21st placed J2 club. If either or both top 2 finishers are ineligible for promotion, the playoffs and/or direct exchange will not be held in accordance with the exact positions of promotion-eligible clubs. Also, if an under-23 squad finishes in either one of the top 2 or both positions, the next-placed, promotion-eligible club takes automatic promotion to J2. Another next-placed eligible club will contest the playoff if any under-23 club occupies third to fourth place or both and the J3 champion is eligible for promotion.

No relegation to the JFL is planned. Up to 2 clubs may be promoted if they are licensed by the J.League for J3 participation and finish within the top 4 of the JFL.

Managerial changes

League table

Results

Top scorers 

Updated to games played on 20 November 2016Source: J.League Data

Attendances

References

J3 League seasons
3